Danny Reece (born January 28, 1955 in San Pedro, California) is an American retired football cornerback.

Family
Daniel Reece Jr., his son is a former professional fighter. After starting his fight career at The University of Nevada, Las Vegas with their boxing team, where he was a two time western regional champion and the 2006 national champion in the welterweight division, Daniel turned professional. He was undefeated in  seven professional bouts before an eye injury forced him into an early retirement in 2010. He returned to the fight game in 2012, this time competing as a mixed martial artist. His MMA career was also short lived as the same eye injury that had forced his retirement from boxing led to his loss of vision in one eye and subsequent second retirement.

Childhood
Danny grew up with 8 siblings—5 brothers and 3 sisters, most of them younger. His brothers also played collegiate football, but Danny was the only one who played professionally. His father, Lloyd Reece, served on the USS Arizona during the bombing of Pearl Harbor and played professional baseball for the Kansas City Monarchs.  Lloyd Reece died in October 2004.

Professional career
Reece played for the Tampa Bay Buccaneers between 1976 and 1980, where he would score the first ever touchdown in franchise history on a fumble return. Reece led the National Football League in punt returns in 1979 and 1980.

College career
Reece was a third-round draft choice from the University of Southern California by the Cincinnati Bengals in the 1976 NFL Draft.

High school career
Prior to USC, Reece prepped at Banning High School in Wilmington, California.

External links
Buc Power Bio

1955 births
Living people
Players of American football from Los Angeles
USC Trojans football players
Tampa Bay Buccaneers players
American football cornerbacks
American football return specialists